Tommy Pico (born December 13, 1983) is an indigenous (Kumeyaay Nation) writer, poet, and podcast host.

Early life
Pico grew up on the Viejas Reservation of the Viejas Group of Capitan Grande Band of Mission Indians, a Kumeyaay tribe near San Diego. His father was a tribal chairman. At age five, Pico started writing comics, and as a teenager he created zines and wrote poetry. His name in Kumeyaay means "bird song".

Pico attended Sarah Lawrence College, where he studied pre-med with the intention of returning to the reservation as a doctor. He decided not to pursue medicine and moved to New York City, where he worked as a barista in Williamsburg and started writing poetry.

In 2008, Pico lived in Bushwick, Brooklyn. In 2019, Pico moved to Los Angeles with a friend of his.

Work
In 2011, Pico was an inaugural mentor in the Queer/Art/Mentors programme; in 2013 he was a Lambda Literary Fellow in Poetry.

In 2016, Pico's first book IRL was published by the small press Birds, LLC. IRL is written as one long text message, drawing on the epic tradition. Pico's poem was written in first-person narration, from the perspective of Teebs. Teebs is a fictional character writing about fictional events, however, the character parallels as Pico's alter-ego and is used as a nickname. IRL received critical acclaim and was included on best-of-the-year lists for 2016. In 2017, it received the Brooklyn Public Library Literary Prize.

Pico's second book, Nature Poem was published in 2017 by Tin House. Nature Poem, like IRL, was written from the perspective of Pico's alter ego and fictional character, Teebs. Pico again used the epic format, in this case to explore and challenge stereotypes of Native Americans as "noble savages" who are one with nature. Nature Poem also received critical acclaim. Pico followed Nature Poem with Junk in 2018 and Feed in 2019. Pico considers his four books as a series called the "Teebs tetralogy".

Pico co-curates the live reading series Poets With Attitude with Morgan Parker, and he is the co-host of the podcast Food 4 Thot, a podcast about queer identity, race, sex, relationships, literature, and pop culture. He is also the co-host of the podcast Scream, Queen! with Drea Washington. Scream, Queen discusses marginalized people and horror films. He also appears in the 2022 documentary series Queer for Fear: The History of Queer Horror.

In 2018, Pico was commissioned to create soundscapes for New York City's High Line park and a walking tour of Seattle for Vignettes Gallery and Gramma Press.

He has written for TV shows including Reservation Dogs and Resident Alien. Pico was chosen as a 2021 Sundance Institute Fellow.

Awards
In 2017, Pico's debut IRL received the Brooklyn Public Library Literary Prize. his second book, Nature Poem, was the winner of a 2018 American Book Award and finalist for the 2018 Lambda Literary Award. He was a 2018 Whiting Award Winner for poetry.

Bibliography
 IRL (2016, Birds,)
 Nature Poem (2017,)
 Junk (2018,)
 Feed (2019,)

References

External links

FEED: A Garden Soundscape
VIGNETTES + GRAMMA PRESENT ‘A LONE’

1983 births
Living people
21st-century American poets
People of Kumeyaay descent
American male poets
21st-century American male writers
Poets from California
Sarah Lawrence College alumni
Native American poets
21st-century Native Americans
American LGBT poets
LGBT Native Americans
American gay writers
Gay poets